Anna Kaiser is an American fitness professional, choreographer, and entrepreneur. Greatist named Kaiser one of the 100 Most Influential People in Health & Fitness. She works as the personal trainer to Kelly Ripa, Shakira, Alicia Keys, and Sarah Jessica Parker and is the founder & CEO of Anna Kaiser Studios, which has locations in New York, Hamptons, and Connecticut.

Career

Kaiser co-hosted the television show My Diet Is Better Than Yours and had a fashion line at Target in 2016.

In 2011, Kaiser started a fitness company, AKT InMotion, first operating studios in New York City, Connecticut, the Hamptons, and pop ups in Los Angeles.  In 2018, Kaiser franchised this fitness concept.
In 2020, Kaiser launched Anna Kaiser Studios.

Personal life
Kaiser married Carlos Wesley in 2012, and they have two children.

References

External links

Living people
American exercise instructors
American women business executives
American business executives
American women choreographers
American choreographers
Year of birth missing (living people)
21st-century American women